Methylcyclopentadiene is any of three isomeric cyclic dialkenes with the formula C5MeH5 (Me = CH3). These isomers are the organic precursor to the methylcyclopentadienyl ligand (C5H4Me, often denoted as Cp′), commonly found in organometallic chemistry.

As with cyclopentadiene, methylcyclopentadiene is prepared by thermal cracking of its Diels–Alder dimer, followed by distillation for removal of cyclopentadiene, a common impurity.

Methylcyclopentadienyl anion 

Deprotonation of methylcyclopentadiene gives the aromatic methylcyclopentadienyl anion. This ion is useful as a ligand for organometallic complexes. Relative to the corresponding cyclopentadienyl (Cp) complexes, complexes of Cp′ exhibit enhanced solubility in organic solvents.

Cp′ can be used to probe the structure of organometallic complexes.  For example, Cp′Fe(PPh3)(CO)I has four different signals in the 1H NMR spectrum for the ring hydrogens and five different signals in the 13C NMR spectrum for the ring carbons. There is therefore no symmetry within the ring even accounting for rotation around the ring–metal axis, but instead there is a diastereotopic relationship as a result of being part of a chiral complex.  The achiral precursor complex Cp′Fe(CO)2I has only two signals for those hydrogens and three for those carbons, indicating a symmetric structure.

References

See also
 Pentamethylcyclopentadiene

Organometallic chemistry
Cyclopentadienes
Hydrocarbons